Isabella Beetham was an 18th-century British silhouette artist. She began her career by cutting the silhouette images. After studying painting with successful miniature portraitist John Smart, Beetham painted silhouettes to be framed or miniatures were made for jewelry. From 1785 to 1809, she had a business on 27 Fleet Street in London, where she produced silhouettes of men and women. She is considered one of the great 18th century silhouette artists, along with John Miers.

Personal life
Isabella Robinson was born between 1750 and 1754. Her family were Roman Catholics and Jacobites. Both her father and grandfather were named John Robinson. Isabella's father was of Sedgefield, Durham and her grandfather, an architect and builder, was of Lancaster, Lancashire.

She eloped with Edward Beetham in the early 1770s, having met him by early 1773. At the time of their meeting he used his original surname, Betham. Edward Betham, who was born in 1744, and estimated to be at least ten years older than his wife. Edward was the eldest of a brother William and their sisters. Edward and William were born at the Long House in Little Strickland. Both Edward and Isabella had been raised by wealthy families who did not approve of the couple's running off together and eloping. Any financial support ceased as a result. Edward was identified as an actor, which was considered a lowly profession of a "rogue and vagabond". As a result of his decision to take up acting and marry a woman of a different faith, Edward changed his surname to Beetham to avoid embarrassing his parents. Edward worked at the Sadler's Wells Theatre in London and Haymarket Theatre. He invented a weighted roll-up curtain for the theatre to avoid curtains from catching fire in the candle foot-lighting. Since he did not have the money for a patent, he did not profit from the widely used invention. He later became a successful inventor and businessman. The Beetham's had six children. The oldest child was Jane, born about 1773, followed by William, born in 1774. After the birth of the second child, Edward reconciled with his parents. Their subsequent children were Harriet, Charles, Cecilia, and Alfred.

The family lived in Cow Lane, Clerkenwell, London and then Little Queen Street, Holborn, London. Edward and Isabella produced a puppet show in 1775 and 1780. Isabella created a frontispiece with a mezzotint portrait of Edward, with images reflecting "Laughter", "Gravity", and "Misery".

The Beethams established their residence and businesses at 26 and 27 Fleet Street in 1785. In the 18th century the area included publishers, engravers, bookstores, and quaint gabled houses. At Fleet Street, the Beetham's entertained artist John Opie, writer William Godwin, publisher John Murray, Lidford Bellamy, poet George Dyer, Dr. Priestley, artist John Smart, and Admiral William and Elizabeth (née Betham) Bligh, who was a relative. She gave lessons to Amelia Alderson, who was also in her circle of friends. She made a silhouette portrait of her in 1794. Charles Lamb remarked that she was a warm, generous, and slightly bohemian woman.

The Beetham's moved into a quaint house with three gables on Chancery Lane, just off Fleet Street, to accommodate the growing family. The house was razed when the lane was widened around the turn of the century.

Early career

Isabella developed a talent for making silhouette portraits, first called profiles and shades, which are a solid outline of an image. Initially, Beetham made the portraits by cutting the images on card and paper. She illustrated details, such as frills, on the silhouette with tiny slashes. Her work routinely has a bust-line finish that differentiates her work from other artists. Women had hair styles and hats typical for the time period; Men had cravats without bows.

Frames, generally oval shaped, were made of giltwood, pearwood, papier-mache, and brass. The frames were often larger than those used by her competitors. A lengthy trade label was affixed on the back of her work after 1774, that conveyed that she produced portraits of loved family members and friends to help people cope with their loss. The message on the label was so large, though, that much of the verbiage was lost when the label was cut to fit the portrait. Over her career, she had seven trade labels, her cut silhouettes per produced using her first three trade labels.

She then studied portrait painting in London with John Smart, who was a successful miniature portrait artist. Beetham painted silhouette portraits on a white background, such as plaster, and often on glass. She made miniature portraits for jewelry. Edward learned a new way to gild glass near Venice in Murano, Italy for his wife's business in 1784 to 1785.

Fleet Street
In early 1785, Edward leased 26 and 27 Fleet Street in London for the family's businesses and residence. A studio was established in 27 Fleet Street for Isabella to paint her silhouettes, and on the lower floors Edward sold washing machines using his patented wooden, rather than stone, mangles. Bust or 3/4 length profiles were painted on thick paper by Beetham and an employee named Mrs. Bull, whose style varied from Beetham. She also employed William Gardiner, who was an actor, artist, scene-painter, and engraver who put finishing touches on the portraits. Beetham was particularly adept at capturing the fashions of the day in great detail.

Likewise, men and women's clothing were painted with "consummate skill", using straight hatching and cross-hatching to paint frills and details. Beetham used different painting techniques, like dot formations and hatching, to illustrate women's dress. Gum arabic was used for shading. In some cases, she used gold for women's profiles. Work made in Beetham's shop was affixed with a trade label on the back of the work.

Into the 1790s, silhouettes were no longer painted on paper. In 1792, Beetham advertised that she created detailed likenesses—with unrivalled taste and elegance—on gold and silver decorated glass, composition, paper, and ivory. She also made miniature portraits for bracelets, lockets, and rings. Beetham was regarded as one of the best silhouettes silhouette makers of her time, particularly for her ability to capture the sitter's features.

Beetham's daughter Jane, who was born about 1779, began assisting her in the work from the early 1790s until 1797, when Jane was married. Jane frequently painted on glass.

Death

Edward died in 1809. Isabella lived her later years at 9 The Polygon, a group of houses at Clarendon Square, Somers Town, London (now between St Pancras and Euston stations). Her daughters also lived in the Somers Town, an area settled by French refugees during their homeland's revolution and was mostly inhabited by people of the Roman Catholic faith and low incomes. Isabella Beetham made out her will on 3 August 1825 and died that month, at her home by the 16th, when her will was proved. She left an estate of £200 to her daughters Cecilia Georgi and Harriet Norman.

Legacy
In was reported in 1991 that one of her silhouettes sold for $3,498 at a Christie's auction. This compares to a silhouette of children, pets and toys by Auguste Edouart (1788-1861) that sold for $2,100 at Skinner and an 1874 silhouette of a husband and wife enjoying tea by William Welling sold at Phillips for $4,832.

In 1995, Michael Christie had one of the finest private silhouette collections, with 120 images by noted silhouette artists, such as Beetham and Miers. The collection was started in 1893 by his mother, Madge Christie. Its highest valued item was a half-length silhouette of a lady by Beetham valued at about £3,000.

Collections
 Brooklyn Museum, New York
 Metropolitan Museum of Art, New York
 Victoria and Albert Museum, London

See also
 Silhouette artists

Notes

References

Further reading
 
 
 

1750s births
1825 deaths
18th-century British painters
18th-century British women artists
British women painters
Silhouettists